André Molitor (4 August 1911 – 4 June 2005) is a former Belgian senior civil servant of the Belgian State and former principal private secretary of King Baudouin I of Belgium from 1961 until 1977 (17 years). André Molitor was also a professor of public administration at the Université catholique de Louvain.

Biography
Molitor was born in Kermanshah, Iran, the son of a Belgian civil servant, established in Iran since 1901, on a mission of modernization of the Iranian customs. In 1935, he obtained the title of Doctor in Law, and since 1937, pursued a career in the Belgian public office. He was also the principal private secretary of the Minister Pierre Harmel and was the craftsman of the school pact of 1958, which ended a period of political dissension over the funding of secondary education. Since the end of World War II, André Molitor directed La Revue Nouvelle, (E : New Review), a Christian Democrat publication in Belgium. He directed the review Administration publique (E: Public administration). At his retirement in 1977, André Molitor took up the presidency of the King Baudouin Foundation, until 1986.

Bibliography
 André Molitor, La Fonction Royale en Belgique, CRISP, 1979
 André Molitor, Souvenirs: un témoin engagé dans la Belgique du 20e siècle, Editions Duculot, 1984

See also
 Jean-Marie Piret
 Jacques van Ypersele de Strihou

Sources
 Francis Delpérée, En Mémoire d'André Molitor, Revue internationale des Sciences administratives - RISA, Volume 71 numéro 3 Septembre 2005
 André Molitor (French)

1911 births
2005 deaths
People from Kermanshah
Belgian politicians
Dignitaries of the Belgian court
Academic staff of the Université catholique de Louvain
Catholic University of Leuven (1834–1968) alumni
Walloon people
Belgian expatriates in Iran